Derek Forbort (born March 4, 1992) is an American professional ice hockey defenseman for the Boston Bruins of the National Hockey League (NHL). He previously played for the Los Angeles Kings, Calgary Flames and Winnipeg Jets. He was originally selected by the Kings, 15th overall, in the 2010 NHL Entry Draft.

Playing career
Forbort played his junior season of high school hockey for Duluth East High School in 2008–09, finishing with 28 points in 21 games, and was named a regional All-Star. He completed the season by playing nine games with the USA Hockey National Team Development Program (USNTDP) in the United States Hockey League (USHL). He played his first full season with the USNTDP in 2009–10, scoring 4 goals and 14 points in 26 USHL league games, and 25 points overall in 56 games with the development team.

He then began his freshman season for the University of North Dakota for the 2010–11 season. He played with the American team at the 2010 IIHF World U18 Championships, recording two assists and a +9 rating, en route to winning a gold medal. Forbort had committed to play for the University of North Dakota men's ice hockey team in the National Collegiate Athletic Association in 2010.

Professional
Forbort was highly regarded by scouts and was projected to become a two-way defenseman in the National Hockey League (NHL). The NHL Central Scouting Bureau ranked Forbort as the ninth best North American skater for the 2010 NHL Entry Draft, an improvement on his midterm ranking of 11th. International Scouting Services named him tenth overall. Expected to be a first round selection, Forbort was taken 15th overall by the Los Angeles Kings.

On April 5, 2013, Forbort signed a three-year entry level contract with the Los Angeles Kings.

In the 2014–15 season, on February 11, 2015, the Kings recalled Forbort from the Manchester Monarchs of the American Hockey League (AHL). He was later returned to the Monarchs without playing a game for the Kings. He eventually made his NHL debut the following season on October 16, 2015, against the Minnesota Wild and recorded his first NHL goal in a 5–0 win over the Vancouver Canucks on December 28.

In the 2016–17 season, his second with the Kings, Forbort made the opening roster. He recorded 18 points in 82 games during the season.

On October 19, 2017, Forbort signed a two-year contract extension with the Kings.

In the 2019–20 season, Forbort began his eighth season within the Kings organization on the injured reserve. After returning from a conditioning assignment with the Ontario Reign, he featured in just 14 games for 1 assist. On February 24, 2020, Forbort was dealt by the Kings at the NHL trade deadline to the Calgary Flames in exchange for a 2021 conditional fourth-round pick.

As a free agent, Forbort signed a one-year, $1 million contract with the Winnipeg Jets on October 11, 2020. In the pandemic delayed  season, Forbort appeared in every game for the Jets on the blueline, contributing with 2 goals and 12 points in 56 regular season games.

On July 28, 2021, Forbort left at the conclusion of his contract with the Jets to sign a three-year, $9 million contract with the Boston Bruins as a free agent. He scored his first goal as a Bruin on October 24, 2021, against the San Jose Sharks.

International play
Forbort played for the US national team at the 2011 World Junior Ice Hockey Championships in Buffalo, New York, winning a bronze medal.

Career statistics

Regular season and playoffs

International

Awards and honors

References

External links
 

1992 births
Living people
American expatriate ice hockey players in Canada
American men's ice hockey defensemen
Boston Bruins players
Calgary Flames players
Ice hockey people from Duluth, Minnesota
Los Angeles Kings draft picks
Los Angeles Kings players
Manchester Monarchs (AHL) players
National Hockey League first-round draft picks
North Dakota Fighting Hawks men's ice hockey players
Ontario Reign (AHL) players
USA Hockey National Team Development Program players
Winnipeg Jets players